São Pedro (Portuguese for "Saint Peter") is a civil parish in the municipality of Funchal in the island of Madeira. The population in 2011 was 7,273, in an area of 1.49 km².

São Pedro is located north of Sé and central to the municipality, surrounded by the parishes of Santo António, Santa Luzia, Imaculado Coração de Maria, São Roque and São Martinho.

Notable people
Cristiano Ronaldo

References

Parishes of Funchal